Tom Dunn  (May 1, 1929–July 2, 2006) was an anchor and reporter at several New York and Florida television stations.

Dunn  was born in Warwick, New York, and was a child actor at radio station WAAT in Newark, New Jersey.  He started in television at WCTV in Tallahassee, Florida in 1959 after leaving the army.  He served as press secretary to U.S. Representative (and later Senator) Ed Gurney (R-FL), then worked as an anchor and reporter for WTVT in Tampa, Florida from 1962 to 1964 before moving to WCBS-TV where he worked from 1964 to 1968. Mr. Dunn served in that same role for WABC-TV from 1969 to 1970 and at WOR-TV from 1971 to 1987. Among his duties at WOR was anchoring the long-running News at Noon. He later worked for WPTV-TV in West Palm Beach, where he did weekend evening and late night news until his retirement in the late 1990s.

Dunn died of esophageal cancer in Stuart, Florida on July 2, 2006.

His wife, Anna Dunn, reported that Richard Nixon asked Dunn to be his press secretary, but he turned down the position because he feared he might not be able to get back into television news if he took the job.  Mr. Dunn was an avid sailor, skier, cooking enthusiast and voracious reader.  Mr. Dunn also appeared in several motion pictures, including Turk 182 and Without A Trace.

External links
 

1929 births
2006 deaths
Deaths from esophageal cancer
Television anchors from New York City
Deaths from cancer in Florida
People from Warwick, New York